Samuel Goldwyn Films is an American film company that licenses, releases and distributes art-house, independent and foreign films. It was founded by Samuel Goldwyn Jr., the son of the Hollywood business magnate/mogul, Samuel Goldwyn. The current incarnation is a successor to The Samuel Goldwyn Company.

Background 
After The Samuel Goldwyn Company was acquired by Orion Pictures Corporation in 1996 and by MGM in 1997, Samuel Goldwyn Jr. founded Samuel Goldwyn Films as an independent production/distribution studio. Until his passing, the younger Goldwyn owned sole rights to the use of the name and signature logo as part of the settlement of his 1999 lawsuit against MGM, which changed its Goldwyn subsidiary's name to G2 Films. Goldwyn previously operated IDP Distribution, which distributed films for Fireworks Films, Stratosphere Entertainment, and Roadside Attractions.

Films 
This is a list of films distributed and/or produced by Samuel Goldwyn Films.

1990s

2000s

2010s

2020s 
{| class="wikitable sortable"
|-
! Release date
! Title
! Notes
|-
|rowspan=12 | 2020
| Shooting Clerks || co-production with Auld Reekie Media and Pink Plaid
|-
|Debt Collectors
|
|-
| City of Joel || co-production with Visit Films
|-
| To the Stars || co-production with Northern Light Films, Foton Pictures and Rockhill Media
|-
| The Flood || co-production with Myriad Pictures and Megatopia Films
|-
| Endings, Beginnings || co-production with CJ Entertainment
|-
| Bull || co-distribution with Sony Pictures Worldwide; co-production with Bert Marcus Film and Invisible Pictures
|-
| Henri Dauman: Looking Up || 
|-
| Mr Jones || co-production with Boy Jones Films, Film Produkcja and Kinorob
|-
| Extracurricular ||
|-
| Triggered ||
|-
| The Good Traitor || 
|-
|rowspan="5"|2021
| Lazarus ||
|-
| Edge of the World ||
|-
| Dreamcatcher ||
|-
| Let Us In ||
|-
| Minamata ||
|-
| rowspan="5" |2022
| Lunana: A Yak in the Classroom || rowspan="3" | U.S. distribution
|-
|Big Gold Brick|-
| Art of Love|- 
| Accident Man: Hitman's Holiday || co-production with Destination Films
|-
| The Devil Conspiracy  
|}

 See also 
 The Samuel Goldwyn Company, predecessor to Samuel Goldwyn Films
 Samuel Goldwyn Studio
 Metro-Goldwyn-Mayer
 Samuel Goldwyn Television
 Samuel Goldwyn Productions

Notes

  Warner Bros. through New Line Cinema is handling the production for The Secret Life of Walter Mitty with Samuel Goldwyn Films and Red Hour Films, while 20th Century Fox will release the film.
  Samuel Goldwyn Films handled the US theatrical release of Detention'', while Sony Pictures Worldwide Acquisitions handled the worldwide release and the US DVD and Blu-ray release.

References

External links 
 Official website 

Film distributors of the United States
Film production companies of the United States
Entertainment companies based in New York City
American companies established in 2000
Mass media companies established in 2000